Prince George was launched in 1806 at Rotherhithe. She began her 48-year career as a West Indiaman. The French captured and released her in December 1814, to carry captured British sailors back to Britain. She then again sailed as a West Indiaman. Towards the end of the 1820s she started sailing to New South Wales. In 1834 she made a voyage under charter to the Hudson's Bay Company. Thereafter she traded between London and Quebec. In 1842 she brought 262 immigrants from England to Quebec. She was last listed in 1854.

Career
Prince George first appeared in Lloyd's Register (LR) in the 1806 volume with J.Bailey, master, Frier & Co., owner, changing to Rutherford & Co., and trade London–Jamaica. She appears to have replaced an earlier  that Rutherford owned, and that next year appears with a new master, Pizzie, and owner, Boyman & Co., though still in the London–Jamaica trade.

The French burnt all the vessels they captured, except Prince George. They put their prisoners into her and sent her off as a cartel to Barbados, which she reached on 10 January 1815.

In 1834 the Hudson's Bay Company chartered Prince George for a voyage from London to York Factory, and back to London. An article on navigation to Hudson Bay reports that Captain Grove sailed Prince George to York Factory. He used a chronometer to record longitude, and did not take lunar distances. Prince George arrived at York Factory on 22 August. There he assumed command of Prince Rupert as her captain had become incapacitated. He took his chronometer with him, suggesting that it was his personal property and not part of Prince Georges equipment. Captain Daniel Friend replaced Grave.

Prince George may have made a second voyage for the HBC in 1837.

On 6 April 1842 Captain Daniel Friend sailed from England, bound for Montreal and Quebec. He arrived on 20 May. Prince George was carrying 262 immigrants. Of these, 219 were paupers, most sailing under the auspices of the Poor Law Commission, and most from Kent. The remaining 43 immigrants were sailing at their own expense. Most of the immigrants were agricultural labourers, though a few had trades, or were servants. All were in good health when they arrived in Canada. Apparently each adult, on leaving Prince George, received a free passage to join their friends in nearby districts. They also received two days' provisions, and 20 shillings.

Fate
Prince George was last listed in 1863 with data unchanged since 1860.

Notes

Citations

References
 
 
 
 

1806 ships
Ships built in Rotherhithe
Age of Sail merchant ships of England
Migrant ships to Canada
Captured ships